The women's 400 metres hurdles at the 2018 IAAF World U20 Championships was held at Ratina Stadium on 11, 12 and 13 July.

Records

Results

Heats
Qualification: First 3 of each heat (Q) and the 6 fastest times (q) qualified for the semifinals.

Semifinals
Qualification: First 2 of each heat (Q) and the 2 fastest times (q) qualified for the final.

Final

References

400 metres hurdles
400 metres hurdles at the World Athletics U20 Championships